The Ninth Army was a field army formation of the British Army during the Second World War, formed on 1 November 1941 by the renaming of Headquarters, British Troops Palestine and Transjordan. The Ninth Army controlled British and Commonwealth land forces stationed in the eastern Mediterranean.

One of the formations that served under Headquarters British Troops Palestine and Transjordan and the Ninth Army was 1st Cavalry Division, which became 10th Armoured Division on 1 August 1941. Among other formations under British Troops Palestine and Transjordan were 7th Infantry Division, 8th Infantry Division (1939–1940), HQ Jerusalem Area (3 September 1939 – 31 October 1941), HQ Lydda Area (3 September 1939 – 31 October 1941) and HQ British Troops Cyprus (15 January 1940 – 31 December 1941).

Commanders
General Sir Henry Maitland Wilson (October 1941 – September 1942)
Lieutenant-General Sir William George Holmes (September 1942 - February 1945)

References

Military units and formations established in 1941
09
09
Military units and formations of the British Empire in World War II